The Education (Provision of Meals) Act 1906 is an Act of the Parliament of the United Kingdom.

Margaret McMillan and Fred Jowet were members of the School Board which introduced free school meals in Bradford. This was actually illegal and the School Board could have been forced to end this service. McMillan and Jowett tried to persuade the Parliament to introduce legislation which encouraged all education authorities to provide free school meals for children. McMillan argued that if the state insists on compulsory education, it must take responsibility for the proper nourishment of school children. A report published in 1889 indicated that over 50,000 pupils in London alone were attending school "in want of food".  Other social studies, such as Charles Booth's Life and Labour of the People of London, 1899-1903 and Seebohm Rowntree's Poverty: A Study of Town Life in York, 1901, found that nearly a third of the population and cities studied were living in poverty.  The 1904 Report into Physical Deterioration followed the large rejection of men from service in the Boer War, as they were malnourished.

The Bill became law over the objection of the House of Lords.

See also 
 School meal

References

Education in England
Government-provided school meals in the United Kingdom
United Kingdom Education Acts
United Kingdom Acts of Parliament 1906
1906 in education